Archiearis parthenias, the orange underwing, is a moth of the family Geometridae. The species was first described by Carl Linnaeus in 1761 and can be found in Europe, Russia and Japan.

The wingspan is about 30–40 mm. The moths fly from February to May depending on the location.

The larvae feed first on the catkins and then on the leaves of birch (Betula species).

References

External links

 Moths and Butterflies of Europe and North Africa
 Kimmo's Lep Site: larvae
 

Archiearinae
Moths described in 1761
Moths of Europe
Taxa named by Carl Linnaeus